The DKW Munga is a DKW-branded off-road vehicle that was built by Auto-Union in Ingolstadt, Germany. The name Munga comes from the German phrase Mehrzweck Universal Geländewagen mit Allradantrieb, which translates as "multi-purpose universal off-road car with all-wheel drive"

Development 

Production began in October 1956 and ended in December 1968. During this time 46,750 cars were built.  The 38th International Motor Show at Frankfurt in the autumn 1957 was a great success for Auto-Union. About this time the Munga was launched. The vehicle, which has extraordinary stamina, was not only adopted by the West German Bundeswehr as a vehicle unique in its class but was also bought in large numbers for the German Border Police and various foreign military formations within NATO.

The civilian version of the Munga was widely adopted in West Germany for agricultural and forestry work in particular, and also became popular abroad, especially in those countries where "go anywhere" transport was needed because of poor roads, such as large parts of South America and South Africa. Around 2000 cars were delivered to the Royal Netherlands Army, many of which were shipped to the UK in the late 1970s.

The Munga was later also available from the end of 1956 as a four-seat pan structure of steel sheet and as a six-or eight-seater platform body.
The term therefore corresponds to the body variant:
 Four seat (Munga 4)
 Pickup (Munga 6)
 Long Pick-up (Munga 8)

The Royal Netherlands Army had intended the Munga as a replacement for the 1956 M38A1 NEKAF Jeep, but the type caused so many problems that it was removed from front line  service prematurely in 1970. The M38A1 NEKAF Jeeps, that had been stored in mobilization compounds for reserve units, were re-issued to operational units  - where they remained in use until 1995.

The Munga was also built in São Paulo, Brazil, by DKW-Vemag, where it was called DKW Candango. The local production lasted from 1958 to 1963 in four-wheel drive and two-wheel drive versions.

See also

Porsche 597
FMC XR311
FN Herstal AS 24
M151
Europa Jeep

References 

Munga
Off-road vehicles
Cold War military vehicles of Germany
Military light utility vehicles